The Vineta Hotel (also known as the Palm Court Hotel or the Chesterfield Hotel) is a historic hotel in Palm Beach, Florida. It is located at 363 Cocoanut Row. On August 21, 1986, it was added to the U.S. National Register of Historic Places.

Previously known as "The Chesterfield Palm Beach" when under the ownership of The Travel Corporation, The property is to be renamed back to one of its original names "The Vineta Hotel" under the new ownership of the Oetker Collection. Its expected to reopen in late 2023 following a light refurbishment.

References

External links
 Palm Beach County listings at National Register of Historic Places
 Florida's Office of Cultural and Historical Programs
 Palm Beach County listings
 Chesterfield Hotel

National Register of Historic Places in Palm Beach County, Florida
Hotels in Palm Beach, Florida